U.S. Highway 20 (US 20) in Iowa is a major east–west artery which runs across the state, separating the northern third of Iowa from the southern two-thirds.  It enters Iowa from Nebraska, concurrent with Interstate 129 and U.S Route 75, crossing the Missouri River at Sioux City.  US 20 runs in a more-or-less straight line across Iowa, paralleling 42° 27' N.  It leaves Iowa in Dubuque by crossing the Mississippi River into Illinois.  Since October 2018, US 20 is a four-lane divided highway for its entire length in Iowa.

Route description
US 20 enters Iowa on the Sergeant Floyd Memorial Bridge, which also carries I-129 and US 75, over the Missouri River.  Almost immediately upon landing in Iowa, there is an interchange with I-29, at which I-129 ends.  Continuing east, US 20 and US 75 run together around the southern and eastern sides of Sioux City.  The two routes split at the Gordon Drive interchange as US 20 exits to the east from Sioux City. The expressway is an older section that goes through Lawton and comes to a stop sign at Moville. About two miles further east, the newest four-lane stretch (except for a short expressway segment just south of Holstein that is briefly concurrent with U.S. Route 59)  starts and goes to about one mile west of an interchange with U.S. Route 71 and Iowa Highway 471, just north of Early.  From this point until an interchange with Iowa Highway 4 northwest of Rockwell City is the second newest section of four-lane, which opened in November 2012.  This new roadway passes to the north of Sac City and Lytton, and has another interchange with the realigned route of U.S. Route 71 northeast of Sac City, but mostly has at-grade intersections, including County M54 into Sac City and N28 into Lytton.

East of Iowa 4, and extending to the former beginning of the four-lane expressway northeast of Moorland (now an interchange with County D36), is a 4-lane section which opened in December 2010, and bypasses Rockwell City to the north. US 20 continues until just south of Highview, when it becomes a full interstate-standard freeway. The expressway south of Fort Dodge has interchanges with U.S. Route 169 and Webster County Route P59. Near Williams, US 20 intersects Interstate 35. Prior to 2003, US 20 joined U.S. Route 65 north through Iowa Falls and then east towards Ackley and Parkersburg before heading south again to the freeway with Iowa Highway 14. The bridge crossing the Iowa River near Steamboat Rock is a launched steel I-girder bridge, the first of its kind in the United States. The bridge was designed to cross the old-growth woodland of the Iowa River valley with minimal impact.

The western junction of Iowa 58 (Hudson Road) connects traffic to the University of Northern Iowa while the eastern junction of Iowa 58 is also the western junction of Iowa Highway 27, the Avenue of the Saints. Another mile east, in Waterloo, US 20 intersects U.S. Route 63 (Sergeant Road). On the southeast side of Waterloo, Interstate 380 joins US 20/IA 27 for  before exiting with Iowa 27 south towards Cedar Rapids.

U.S. 20 continues as a freeway east of Waterloo.  It intersects Iowa Highway 150 at Independence and Iowa Highway 13 at Manchester, as well as junctioning a number of county roads serving smaller communities.  Approximately  between Independence and Manchester go over a terminal moraine and enter the Driftless Area, a region it will not exit until reaching Stockton, Illinois.

At Delaware, US 20 changes from a freeway to an expressway with at-grade intersections; however, there are many interchanges where US 20 meets major roads, mostly at the villages and towns along US 20's route.  US 20 serves Earlville, Dyersville (where US 52 joins the route and passing near the Field of Dreams filming site), Farley, Epworth, and Peosta before entering Dubuque. On the western edge of Dubuque, an interchange onto the Southwest Arterial routes US 52 around the southern outskirts of the city, connecting to U.S. Highway 61 and U.S. Highway 151. US 20 remains at least four lanes through Dubuque, but there are 9 stoplights along the route, particularly on the western edge of the city.  There is a brief controlled-access section where the highway descends into the Mississippi River valley.  Near the river, Locust Street connects US 20 with U.S. Highway 61 and U.S. Highway 151, which have entered the city from the south as an expressway and continue northward as a freeway.  US 20 crosses from Iowa into Illinois via the Julien Dubuque Bridge.

History

U.S. Highway 20 was designated in Iowa on October 16, 1926.  The designation created a single route number for drivers to follow across the state from Sioux City to Dubuque; previously, three route numbers were used.

It is possible to drive most of US 20's former two-lane alignment from Early to Dubuque.  Most of this routing (with the exception of Iowa Highway 57 from US 65 to Cedar Falls) is now under city and county control, but most of the guide signs remain from when US 20 followed this route.  From Moorland, the highway's former alignment is U.S. Highway 20 Business through Fort Dodge. At Webster County Route P59, it continues on Webster County Route D20.  The road changes designations several times between this point and Iowa Falls, but its route is very clear.  It follows US 65 north out of Iowa Falls to the junction of Iowa 57, then follows 57 to Cedar Falls.  At Cedar Falls, the former alignment continues on US 218 to Broadway Street; through Waterloo, it follows Broadway to Franklin Street to Dubuque Road.  Beyond Waterloo, the designation of the road again changes several times, but the route to follow remains clear. Between Dyersville and Farley, US 20 follows its historic alignment. At Farley, the former alignment follows Old Highway Road into Dubuque.

Expansion project
The first segment of US 20 in Iowa to become four lanes was a short expressway segment east of Moville, which opened in 1958. Another short expressway segment in the Dubuque area opened in 1959. The rest of the expressway from Sioux City to Moville opened in 1964.  By 1979 the Sioux City bypass was complete, as well as the section from Iowa 17 to Interstate 35, and the section from Independence to Delaware. By the end of the 1980s, the four-lane portions of US 20 ran from Coalville (near Fort Dodge) to Interstate 35 and from Waterloo to Dubuque.

During the 1990s little work was done to the route.  It was extended westward to US 169 in 1991, and eastward to US 65 the same year, though initially the section from I-35 to US 65 was only two lanes.  The new, semi-controlled section in Dubuque opened in 1996.  Work began to accelerate in 2000, with the section between Interstate 35 and U.S. Highway 65 becoming four lanes that year.  The segment from Iowa 14 to Cedar Falls also opened in 2000.  By 2003, the highway was complete from Fort Dodge to Dubuque.

Paving work between Iowa Highway 4 and Moorland was completed in 2010 and the stretch was opened in December 2010. In November 2012, the 4-lane highway opened between Iowa 4 near Rockwell City and US 71 at Early, Iowa.

Local leaders were lobbying for the remaining estimated cost of $375 million to complete the project.

In November 2015, it was announced that the final forty miles of US 20 between Early and Moville will be upgraded to four lanes at an estimated cost of $240 million.  The funding came from the state's gas tax increase.  The final segment was completed in October, 2018.

Exit list

Related route

Iowa Highway 946's short route begins at a partial trumpet interchange along the US 61 / US 151 expressway.  Northbound traffic passes beneath the expressway and joins southbound traffic on Locust Street.  In the half-mile between US 61 / US 151 and US 20, Iowa 946 passes a light industrial area containing a Hy-Vee grocery store.

Iowa 946 intersects U.S. Highway 20, known locally as Dodge Street, at a signal-controlled intersection.  Immediately east of this intersection is the approach to the Julien Dubuque Bridge, which carries US 20 across the Mississippi River into East Dubuque, Illinois.  Iowa 946 continues north on Locust for  through another light industrial area.  At the edge of downtown Dubuque, Highway 946 turns east for  where it meets US 61 / US 151 just west of Dubuque's Ice Harbor.	
Iowa 946 was created along Locust Street upon the staggered completion of an expressway starting in 1991 which relocated U.S. Highway 52, U.S. Highway 61, and U.S. Highway 151 away from Locust Street and closer to the Mississippi River.  The new expressway carried the three routes beneath the approach to the Julien Dubuque Bridge, making a direct intersection impossible.  Since all four routes are U.S. Highways and come from all directions, it was imperative to keep the routes connected. With the completion of the Southwest Arterial around the southern edge of Dubuque, US 52 has been rerouted away from the Downtown area.

References

External links
US 20 at the Iowa Highways Page
U.S. 20 Corridor Association (group advocating completion of the four-lane expressway in western Iowa)

 Iowa
20
Transportation in Woodbury County, Iowa
Transportation in Ida County, Iowa
Transportation in Sac County, Iowa
Transportation in Calhoun County, Iowa
Transportation in Webster County, Iowa
Transportation in Hamilton County, Iowa
Transportation in Hardin County, Iowa
Transportation in Grundy County, Iowa
Transportation in Black Hawk County, Iowa
Transportation in Buchanan County, Iowa
Transportation in Delaware County, Iowa
Transportation in Dubuque County, Iowa